Holmlund is a Swedish-language surname. Notable people with the surname include:

 Anna Holmlund, Swedish ski cross athlete
 Anne Holmlund, Finnish politician
 Bertil Holmlund, Swedish economist
 Richard Holmlund, Swedish football manager

Swedish-language surnames